The 2006 edition of the Clásica de San Sebastián cycle race took place in the Basque city of San Sebastián on August 12, 2006. It was surprisingly won by little known Spanish cyclist Xavier Florencio of the Bouygues Télécom cycling team.

General Standings

12-08-2006: San Sebastián, 227 km.

References

External links
Race website
2006 Clásica de San Sebastián on UCI website

2006 UCI ProTour
2006
San